Rhinanthus angustifolius, the narrow-leaved rattle or greater yellow-rattle, is a plant species of the genus Rhinanthus. It is an annual wildflower native to temperate grasslands in much of Europe, and north and central Western Asia. The yellow flowers are mostly visited by bumblebees.

Distribution
Rhinanthus angustifolius has native distribution in:
Europe
Northern Europe: Denmark; Finland; Norway; Sweden; Estonia; Latvia; Lithuania; United Kingdom, and the northwestern Russian Federation's  European Northwestern Federal District oblasts and republics, including Karelia and Saint Petersburg-Leningrad Oblast.
Middle Europe: Austria; Belgium; Czech Republic; Germany; Hungary; Netherlands; Poland; Slovakia; Switzerland.
Southwestern Europe: France
East Europe: Belarus; Moldova; Ukraine; and the western Russian Federation's European Central Federal District and Volga Federal District oblasts and republics; including Kirov, Moscow-Moscow Oblast, Smolensk, and Tula
Southeastern Europe: Bulgaria; Romania; Slovenia, North Macedonia, Croatia, and the other Balkans countries.

This annual root-parasite was formerly a widespread weed of arable land in east Britain. However, most of the remaining sites are on the North Downs, in grassland and open scrub on chalk. In Lincolnshire, it occurs on peat in an area of cleared Pteridium and on railway ballast. In Angus, a tiny colony survives in sandy coastal grassland.

Asia
Western Asia: Turkey
Caucasus:
Transcaucasus: in Armenia; Azerbaijan, and Georgia.
Ciscaucasia: in the Russian Federation's Eurasian North Caucasian Federal District oblasts and republics; including Chechnya, the Sochi region in Krasnodar Krai, and North Ossetia.
Pontic–Caspian steppe: western Kazakhstan; the Russian Federation's central-western Asian Southern Federal District oblasts and republics; including Kalmykia Republic and Volgograd.
West Siberian Plain: the Russian Federation's northwestern Asia region of the western Siberian Federal District; including the Oblasts of Chelyabinsk, Novosibirsk, and Omsk.

Synonyms
Alectorolophus major Rchb.,
Alectorolophus glaber (Lam.) Beck
Alectorolophus montanus (Saut.) Frits
Rhinanthus apterus (R. angustifolius subsp. grandiflorus)
Rhinanthus glaber Lam. (R. angustifolius subsp. angustifolius)
Rhinanthus grandiflorus (Wallr.) Bluff & Fingerh. (R. angustifolius subsp. grandiflorus)
Rhinanthus major
Rhinanthus montanus Sauter (R. angustifolius subsp. angustifolius)
Rhinanthus parviflorus Noulet (R. angustifolius subsp. angustifolius)
Rhinanthus reichenbachii Bentham in DC. (R. angustifolius  subsp. grandiflorus)
Rhinanthus serotinus (Schönheit) Oborny (R. angustifolius subsp. angustifolius)
Rhinanthus vernalis (Zinger) Schischk. & Sergueievkaja (R. angustifolius subsp. grandiflorus
Rhinanthus × poeverleinii (R. angustifolius subsp. ? × glacialis)

Vernacular names
Common names for Rhinanthus angustifolius in various languages include:
German = Großer Klappertopf
English = Greater yellow-rattle
Finnish = Isolaukku
Dutch = Grote ratelaar
Macedonian = Голема шумарига
Polish = Szelężnik większy
Swedish = Höskallra
Welsh = Cribell felen fawr

References

U.K. Wildflowers - Rhinanthus angustifolius - website page

angustifolius
Flora of France
Flora of Estonia
Flora of Finland
Flora of Siberia
Flora of Russia
Flora of Ukraine
Flora of Poland
Flora of Norway
Flora of Sweden
Flora of Slovakia
Flora of the Czech Republic
Flora of Germany
Flora of Denmark
Flora of the Netherlands
Flora of Belgium
Flora of Italy
Flora of Switzerland
Flora of Austria
Flora of Hungary
Flora of Bulgaria
Flora of Romania
Flora of Slovenia
Flora of Croatia
Flora of Turkey
Flora of the United Kingdom
Flora of Armenia
Flora of Azerbaijan